Guaranteed to Disagree is the first studio EP by American rock band We Are the In Crowd, released on June 8, 2010. The lead single, "For The Win", was released November 10, 2009. The second single, "Never Be What You Want", was released December 8, 2009. The third single, "Lights Out", was released April 13, 2010. The fourth single, "Both Sides Of The Story", was released May 11, 2010. Between late June and early August, the band performed on Warped Tour. A music video for "Lights Out" was filmed in New Jersey in late February 2011.

Track listing
All songs written by We Are the In Crowd

Credits
We Are the In Crowd
Taylor Jardine – Vocals
Cameron Hurley – Guitar
Jordan Eckes – Guitar, Vocals
Mike Ferri – Bass
Rob Chianelli – Drums

Production
Zack Odom
Kenneth Mount

Chart performance
Guaranteed to Disagree peaked at #39 on the Billboard Heatseekers Albums.

References

External links

Guaranteed to Disagree (deluxe edition) at YouTube (streamed copy where licensed)

2010 debut EPs
We Are the In Crowd albums
Hopeless Records EPs